Steroid-induced skin atrophy is thinning of the skin as a result of prolonged exposure to steroids. In people with psoriasis using topical steroids it occurs in up to 5% of people after a year of use.

Skin atrophy can occur with both prescription and over the counter steroids creams. Low doses of prednisone by mouth can also result in skin atrophy.

Signs and symptoms

It can also present with telangiectasia, easy bruising, purpura, and striae. Occlusive dressings and fluorinated steroids both increase the likelihood of developing atrophy.

Prevention 
In general, use a potent preparation short term and weaker preparation for maintenance between flare-ups. While there is no proven best benefit-to-risk ratio, if prolonged use of a topical steroid on a skin surface is required, a pulse therapy should be undertaken.

Pulse therapy refers to the application of a corticosteroid for 2 or 3 consecutive days each week or two. This is useful for maintaining control of chronic diseases. Generally a milder topical steroid or non-steroid treatment is used on the in-between days.

Strong steroids should be avoided on sensitive sites such as the face, groin and armpits. Even the application of weaker or safer steroids should be limited to less than two weeks on those sites.

Treatment 
The obvious priority is immediate discontinuation of any further topical corticosteroid use. Protection and support of the impaired skin barrier is another priority. Eliminating harsh skin regimens or products will be necessary to minimize potential for further purpura or trauma, skin sensitivity, and potential infection. Steroid-induced skin atrophy is often permanent, though if caught soon enough and the topical corticosteroid discontinued in time, the degree of damage may be arrested or slightly improve. However, while the accompanying telangiectasias may improve marginally, the stretch marks are permanent and irreversible.

References 



Drug safety
Corticosteroids
Cutaneous conditions